Jason Taylor (born 23 February 1994) is an Australian tennis player.

Taylor has a career high ATP doubles ranking of 228 achieved on 30 January 2023.

Taylor made his ATP main draw debut at the 2022 Adelaide International 1 after receiving a wildcard into the doubles main draw with his brother Adam Taylor.

ATP Challenger and ITF Futures finals

Doubles: 18 (10–8)

References

External links

1994 births
Living people
Australian male tennis players
Tennis people from New South Wales